Rowland Talbot was a British screenwriter of the silent era.

Selected filmography
 The Lure of London (1914)
 Jane Shore (1915)
 Tommy Atkins (1915)
 Jack Tar (1915)
 Five Nights (1915)
 The Lure of Drink (1915)
 Brigadier Gerard (1915)
 The Rogues of London (1915)
 Beneath the Mask (1915)
 The Picture of Dorian Gray (1916)
 Kent, the Fighting Man (1916)
 Ora Pro Nobis (1917)
 Thelma (1918)
 The Secret Woman (1918)

References

External links

Date of birth unknown
1918 deaths
20th-century British screenwriters